Predator is a 1987 American science fiction action film directed by John McTiernan and written by brothers Jim and John Thomas. It is the first installment in the Predator franchise. It stars Arnold Schwarzenegger as the leader of an elite paramilitary rescue team on a mission to save hostages in guerrilla-held territory in a Guatemala Central American rainforest,  who encounter the deadly Predator (Kevin Peter Hall), a skilled, technologically advanced alien who stalks and hunts them down.

Predator was written in 1984 under the working title of Hunter. Filming ran from March to June 1986 with creature effects devised by Stan Winston; the budget was around $15 million. 20th Century Fox released the film on June 12, 1987, in the United States, and it grossed $98 million worldwide. Initial reviews were mixed, but the film has since been considered a classic of the action and science fiction genres and one of the best films of the 1980s, and was nominated for an Academy Award for best Visual Effects.

The success of Predator launched a media franchise of films, novels, comic books, video games, and toys. It spawned four sequels: Predator 2 (1990), Predators (2010), The Predator (2018), and Prey (2022). A crossover with the Alien franchise produced the  Alien vs. Predator films, which include Alien vs. Predator (2004) and Aliens vs. Predator: Requiem (2007).

Plot

An alien spacecraft deploys a shuttle to Earth, where Vietnam War veteran Major Alan "Dutch" Schaefer and his military rescue team, consisting of Mac, Poncho, Blain, Billy, and Hawkins, are tasked with rescuing a foreign cabinet minister and his aide from insurgents in an unspecified South American country. CIA officer Al Dillon, a Vietnam War buddy of Dutch's, is assigned to accompany the team over Dutch's objections. En route, the team discovers the wreckage of a helicopter and three skinned corpses. Dutch identifies them as Green Berets that he knew and becomes suspicious of Dillon's intentions. The team reaches the guerilla camp and witnesses the execution of a hostage. They mount an attack, killing most of the rebels and several Soviet intelligence officers. Dutch confronts Dillon, who reveals their true mission was to stop a planned Soviet-backed invasion and that the CIA sent the Green Berets weeks earlier for the same mission. 

The only surviving guerilla, Anna, is captured. Learning that more rebels are coming, the team chooses to trek to the extraction point. They are followed by an entity employing a cloaking device and thermal imaging technology, but a spooked Billy glimpses it, creating a situation where Anna attempts an escape. Hawkins catches her, but the creature attacks and kills him while sparing Anna. Dutch organizes a search party, but Blain is killed by the creature's plasma cannon. Enraged, Mac provokes everyone to blindly fire their weapons into the jungle, unknowingly wounding the creature. As the creature administers first-aid to itself, the commandos regroup and realize they are being hunted. Dillon believes two or three guerrillas are responsible, but Billy is adamant that their pursuer is not human. They make camp for the night and set traps, which are triggered by a wild boar. In the confusion, Mac kills it while the creature steals Blain's body.

Dutch later realizes that their enemy uses the trees to travel and frees Anna, who states that her people had seen similarly mutilated bodies before. The next day, the group constructs a net trap and captures the creature, but it frees itself and Poncho is injured. Mac and Dillon pursue it but are outmaneuvered and killed. As the survivors flee, Billy stays behind to fight the creature. The creature kills Billy before following the survivors and killing Poncho. Realizing it does not attack unarmed individuals, Dutch tells the unarmed Anna to head to the extraction point. Dutch attempts to distract the creature by fleeing but is followed to a muddy riverbank and covered in mud. The creature fails to see him and leaves to collect trophies from the others. Dutch realizes the cool mud provided camouflage for his body heat. He crafts makeshift traps and weapons and lures the creature out at night with a war cry and torch. 

Dutch lightly injures the creature and disables its cloaking device as the creature fires wildly into the forest, and tries to escape, but accidentally falls into the river, where the water dissolves his muddy camouflage. As the creature corners Dutch, it removes its mask and plasma cannon to fight him hand-to-hand, having deemed him a worthy opponent. Despite being overpowered and outsmarted, Dutch attempts to goad the creature into a booby trap. It goes around, but Dutch triggers the trap anyway, crushing the creature with the trap's counterweight. With the alien mortally wounded, he asks it, "What the hell are you?" The creature repeats the question back to Dutch and activates its self-destruct device, maniacally laughing as it counts down. Realizing what it has done, Dutch runs for cover and survives the explosion. He is then rescued by the extraction helicopter, with Anna already safely onboard, though he is left traumatized by the experience.

Cast

Production

Development
Following the release of Rocky IV, a joke circulated in Hollywood that since Rocky Balboa had run out of earthly opponents, he would have to fight an alien if a fifth film were to be made. Screenwriters Jim and John Thomas took the inspiration from the joke and wrote a screenplay based on it. The Thomas script for Predator was originally titled Hunter. The original concept, centered on a plot of "what it is to be hunted," concerned a band of alien hunters of various species seeking various targets; that concept was eventually streamlined to one extraterrestrial hunting the most dangerous species, humans, and the "most dangerous man," a combat soldier. Additionally, the setting was chosen as Central America for having constant special forces operations during that period.

As the Thomas brothers were first time screenwriters with little credibility in Hollywood, they struggled to attract attention for their proposed film, and eventually resorted to slipping the script under the door of 20th Century Fox producer Michael Levy (who would go on to serve as executive producer on the film's sequel, Predator 2). Levy then brought the screenplay to producer Joel Silver who, based on his experience with Commando, decided to turn the science-fiction pulp story line into a big-budget film. Silver enlisted his former boss Lawrence Gordon as co-producer and John McTiernan was hired as director for his first studio film. At one point, New Zealand director Geoff Murphy was also considered to direct.

Casting

Silver and Gordon first approached Arnold Schwarzenegger with the lead role. Schwarzenegger said: 

He had previously starred in Commando, on which Silver had served as producer. To play the elite band of soldiers, both Silver and Gordon, with co-producer John Davis, searched for other larger-than-life men of action. Carl Weathers, who had been memorable as boxer Apollo Creed in the Rocky films, was their first choice to play Dillon while professional wrestler and former Navy SEAL Jesse Ventura was hired for his formidable physique as Blain, co-starring with Schwarzenegger the same year in The Running Man. Also cast were Sonny Landham, Richard Chaves, and Bill Duke, who costarred alongside Schwarzenegger in Commando.

Jean-Claude Van Damme was originally cast as the Predator with the intent that the physical action star would use his martial arts skills to make the Predator an agile, ninja-like hunter. But when the 5'9" Van Damme was compared to Schwarzenegger, Weathers, and Ventura — actors over 6 feet tall and known for their bodybuilding regimens — it became apparent a more physically imposing man was needed to make the creature appear threatening. Additionally, it was reported that Van Damme constantly complained about the monster suit being too hot and causing him to pass out. He allegedly had also repeatedly voiced reservations about only appearing on camera in the suit. Additionally, the original design for the Predator was felt to be too cumbersome and difficult to manage in the jungle and, even with a more imposing actor, did not provoke enough fear. Van Damme was removed from the film and replaced by the 7'2" Kevin Peter Hall, who had just finished work as a sasquatch in Harry and the Hendersons.

Filming
Commitments by Schwarzenegger delayed the start of filming by several months. The delay gave Silver enough time to secure a minor rewrite from screenwriter David Peoples. Principal photography eventually began in the jungles of Palenque, Chiapas, Mexico, during the last week of March 1986, but  of the film was shot in Mismaloya, Mexico. Much of the material dealing with the unit's deployment in the jungle was completed in a few short weeks and both Silver and Gordon were pleased by the dailies provided by McTiernan. On Friday, April 25, production halted so that Schwarzenegger could get to his wedding on time, flying to Hyannis Port in a Learjet chartered by Silver. Schwarzenegger was married on April 26, 1986, to Maria Shriver, and honeymooned for only three days while the second unit completed additional filming. The production resumed filming on May 12 and ended in late June 1986.

Both McTiernan and Schwarzenegger lost 25 pounds during the film. Schwarzenegger's weight loss was a professional choice while McTiernan lost the weight because he avoided the food in Mexico due to health concerns. Unlike McTiernan, most of the cast and crew suffered from Travelers' diarrhea's since the Mexican hotel in which they were living had problems with its water purification. In an interview, Carl Weathers said the actors would secretly wake up as early as 3:00 a.m. to work out before the day's shooting. Weathers also stated that he would act as if his physique was naturally given to him and would work out only after the other actors were nowhere to be seen.

According to Schwarzenegger, filming was physically demanding. The actor—and former bodybuilder—shipped gym equipment to Mexico and trained intensively every day before shooting began, usually with his co-stars. Screenwriter Jim Thomas was impressed with the training regimen and said: "I think that phrase 'manly men' was coined [during the production of Predator]". Among other tasks, Schwarzenegger had to swim in very cold water and spent three weeks covered in mud for the climactic battle with the alien. In addition, cast and crew endured very cold temperatures in the Mexican jungle that required heat lamps to be on all of the time. Cast and crew filmed on rough terrain that, according to the actor, was never flat, "always on a hill. We stood all day long on a hill, one leg down, one leg up. It was terrible." Schwarzenegger also faced the challenge of working with Kevin Peter Hall, who could not see in the Predator suit. The actor recalled that "when he's supposed to slap me around and stay far from my face, all of a sudden, whap! There is this hand with claws on it!" Hall stated in an interview that his experience on the film "wasn't a movie, it was a survival story for all of us." For example, in the scene where the Predator chases Dutch, the water was foul, stagnant and full of leeches. Hall could not see out of the mask and had to rehearse his scenes with it off and memorize where everything was. The outfit was difficult to wear because it was heavy and affected his balance.

Visual effects
The original Predator creature was created by Richard Edlund of Boss Film Studios and was a disproportionate, ungainly creature with large yellow eyes and a dog-like head, and nowhere near as agile as necessary for what the filmmakers had intended.  After a call was put out for a new alien creature costume, creature effects artist Rick Baker put in a bid, but ultimately McTiernan consulted Stan Winston. Winston had previously worked with Schwarzenegger as a visual effects artist on the 1984 film The Terminator. While on a plane ride to Fox studios alongside Aliens director James Cameron, Winston sketched monster ideas. Cameron suggested he had always wanted to see a creature with mandibles, which became part of the Predator's iconic look.

R/Greenberg Associates created the film's optical effects, including the alien's ability to become invisible, its thermal vision point of view, its glowing blood, and the electrical spark effects.

The invisibility effect was achieved by having someone wearing a bright red suit (because it was the farthest opposite of the green of the jungle and the blue of the sky) the size of the Predator. The red was removed with chroma key techniques, leaving an empty area. The take was then repeated without the actors using a 30% wider lens on the camera. When the two takes were combined optically, the jungle from the second take filled in the empty area. Because the second take was filmed with a wider lens, a vague outline of the alien could be seen with the background scenery bending around its shape.

For thermal vision, infrared film could not be used because it did not register in the range of body temperature wavelengths. The filmmakers used an Inframetrics thermal video scanner because it gave good heat images of objects and people. The glowing blood was achieved by green liquid from glow sticks mixed with personal lubricant for texture. The electrical sparks were rotoscoped animation using white paper pins registered on portable light tables to black-and-white prints of the film frames. The drawings were composited by the optical crew for the finished effects. Additional visual effects, mainly for the opening title sequence of the Predator arriving on Earth, were supplied by Dream Quest Images (later Oscar-winners for their work on The Abyss and Total Recall). The film was nominated for an Academy Award for Best Visual Effects.

Music

The score was composed by Alan Silvestri, who was coming off the huge success of Back to the Future in 1985. Predator was his first major action movie and the score is full of his familiar genre characteristics: heavy horn blasts, staccato string rhythms, and undulating timpani rolls that highlight the action and suspense. Little Richard's song "Long Tall Sally" is featured in the helicopter en route to the jungle. Mac also recites a few lines from the song as he's chasing the Predator after it escapes from their booby trap. Silvestri returned for the sequel, making him the only composer to have scored more than one film in either the Alien or Predator series.

In 2003, Varèse Sarabande released the soundtrack album as part of its limited release CD Club collection; the album also includes the Elliot Goldenthal arrangement of the 20th Century Fox fanfare used on Alien 3.

In 2007, Brian Tyler adapted and composed some of Silvestri's themes used in the score of the film Aliens vs. Predator: Requiem.

In 2010, the same year Predators featured an adaptation of Silvestri's score by John Debney, Intrada Records released the album in a 3000-copy limited edition with remastered sound, many cues combined and renamed, and most notably (as with Intrada's release of Basil Poledouris's score for RoboCop) presenting the original end credits music as recorded (the film versions are mixed differently). This release is notable for having sold out within a day.

In 2018, Henry Jackman adapted and composed Silvestri's themes in the score of the film, The Predator.

Release

Home media
Predator was first released on VHS on January 21, 1988.  It was later released on DVD on December 26, 2000. The film was later released on Blu-ray on April 15, 2008. It was released on Blu-ray 3D on December 17, 2013, and on Ultra HD Blu-ray on August 7, 2018.

SVOD viewership
According to the streaming aggregator JustWatch, Predator was the 9th most streamed film across all platforms in the United States, during the week ending August 1, 2022, and the 10th during the week ending August 14, 2022.

Reception

Box office
Released on June 12, 1987, Predator was No. 1 at the US box office in its opening weekend with a gross of $12 million, which was second to only Beverly Hills Cop II for the calendar year 1987. The film grossed $98,267,558, of which $59,735,548 was from the US & Canadian box office. $38,532,010 was made in other countries.

Critical response
From contemporary reviews, Janet Maslin of The New York Times described the film as "grisly and dull, with few surprises." Dean Lamanna wrote in Cinefantastique that "the militarized monster movie tires under its own derivative weight." Michael Wilmington of the Los Angeles Times proclaimed it "arguably one of the emptiest, feeblest, most derivative scripts ever made as a major studio movie." Variety wrote that the film was a "slightly above-average actioner that tries to compensate for tissue-thin-plot with ever-more-grisly death sequences and impressive special effects." Adam Barker of The Monthly Film Bulletin found that "unfortunately, special effects have also been substituted for suspense" and that "the early appearance of the Predator makes the final gladiatorial conflict predictable, and the monster's multiple transformations also exhaust interest in its final appearance."

Though finding the creature's motivations poorly explained, critic Roger Ebert was more complimentary of the film. He wrote: "Predator moves at a breakneck pace, it has strong and simple characterizations, it has good location photography and terrific special effects, and it supplies what it claims to supply: an effective action movie." The Hollywood Reporters Duane Byrge felt the Predator's weaponized attacks relied too heavily on special effects, but allowed that the film is a "well-made, old-style assault movie" and a "full-assault" visual experience.

In a retrospective review, Film4 called the movie a "fast paced, high testosterone, edge-of-the-seat experience", and the titular character a "masterful creation". Chris Hewitt of Empire wrote: "Predator has gradually become a sci-fi and action classic. It's not difficult to see why. John McTiernan's direction is claustrophobic, fluid and assured, staging the action with aplomb but concentrating just as much on tension and atmosphere... A thumping piece of powerhouse cinema." Peter Suderman of Reason magazine noted that "over the last 30-odd years, it has come to be regarded a classic of '80s action cinema". Audiences polled by CinemaScore gave the film an average grade of "B+" on an A+ to F scale.

Legacy
Predator has appeared on a number of "best of" lists. In 2007, C. Robert Cargill of RealNetworks resource, Film.com (now merged into MTV Movies), ranked Predator as the seventh best film of 1987, calling it "one of the great science fiction horror films, often imitated, but never properly duplicated, not even by its own sequel." Entertainment Weekly named it the 22nd greatest action movie of all time in 2007, and the 14th among "The Best Rock-'em, Sock-'em Movies of the Past 25 Years" in 2009, saying "Arnold Schwarzenegger has never been as manly as he was in this alien-hunting testosterone-fest." In 2012, IGN proclaimed it the 13th greatest action movie of all time. In 2008, Empire magazine ranked it 366th on their list of "The 500 Greatest Movies of All Time". Predator was ranked 4th in a 2015 Rolling Stone reader poll of the all-time best action films; it was described by reporter Andy Greene as "freakin' awesome". In a 2018 review for IGN, William Bibbiani called Predator, "The most subversive action movie of the 1980s" and cites examples from the film of satire of the action film genre as a whole. In his review, he writes, "Predator may be a big, macho action movie, but it's also highly critical of the kinds of characters you'd normally find in big, macho action movies, and the superficial, unquestioningly heroic stories they appear in."

The line "Get to the choppa" was subsequently associated with Arnold Schwarzenegger, especially when Schwarzenegger said the line again in some of his later appearances, including The New Celebrity Apprentice and advertisements for the mobile video game Mobile Strike. Lieutenant Andrew Pierce – Christian Boeving's leading hero from the 2003 action film When Eagles Strike – was based on Schwarzenegger's image in the film. In 2013, NECA released action figure collectables of Major Dutch and the Predator. That same year, Predator was converted into 3D for a Blu-ray release.

The Predator makes an appearance in Tom Clancy's Ghost Recon: Wildlands, in a bonus mission called "The Hunt". In 2021, the Predator was featured in the video game Fortnite as a cosmetic outfit for the character and a hidden enemy in the game, the first of which gave players the associated abilities such as invisibility and the shoulder cannon.

The film inspired Ander Monson's 2022 book "Predator: A Memoir, a Movie, an Obsession".

Academy Award Nomination
When it came time to recognize Predator with an Academy Award nomination, the combination of techniques used had the Academy of Motion Picture Arts and Sciences officials scratching their heads, unsure as to which category the Predator belonged. The mechanical features of the character’s head suggested the makeup effects category; but, due to the camouflage effect, there was a visual effects aspect to the character, as well. Ultimately, Stan Winston was nominated for an Oscar for Predator in the visual effects category - just as he had been for Aliens - but he and his co-nominees lost to the effects team from Innerspace. This illustrates just how confused the Academy was over this new blending of special effects, makeup and visual effects technologies. The same year that it categorized the Predator creature as a visual effect, it honored Rick Baker with an Oscar in the makeup category for his work on Harry and the Hendersons. This was despite the fact that Harry had been achieved in exactly the same way that the Predator had, with a performer wearing a suit and a mechanical head. In fact, the same actor, Kevin Peter Hall had performed in both suits.

Other media

Merchandise
The success of Predator resulted in numerous novels, comic books, video games and toys.

Sequels

The success of Predator led 20th Century Fox to finance three direct sequels over the next thirty-one years, each by different directors, starting with Predator 2 released in 1990. Arnold Schwarzenegger has not reprised his role as Dutch Schaefer in the subsequent sequels; he had been made offers to return but declined on all of these occasions. in 2007. The third sequel, Predators, was released in 2010, with The Predator released in 2018.

Crossovers

A number of these began appearing under the Alien vs. Predator title, which brought the Predator creatures together with the creatures of the Alien films, and a film series followed with Alien vs. Predator in 2004 and Aliens vs. Predator: Requiem

Prequel

A prequel to the franchise, Prey, was streamed on August 5, 2022, as a Hulu original film.

See also
 List of monster movies
 List of American films of 1987
 Arnold Schwarzenegger filmography
 Survival film

Notes

References

External links

 
 

1987 films
1987 horror films
1980s action horror films
1980s science fiction action films
1980s science fiction horror films
1980s monster movies
1980s American films
1980s English-language films
1980s Spanish-language films
Predator (franchise) films
American action horror films
American science fiction action films
American science fiction horror films
American monster movies
20th Century Fox films
Davis Entertainment films
Silver Pictures films
Films shot from the first-person perspective
Films scored by Alan Silvestri
Films directed by John McTiernan
Films produced by John Davis
Films produced by Joel Silver
Films produced by Lawrence Gordon
Films set in 1987
Films set in Central America
Films set in jungles
Films set in a fictional country
Films shot in Mexico
Films about extraterrestrial life
Films with screenplays by Jim Thomas (screenwriter)
Films with screenplays by John Thomas (screenwriter)
Internet memes